The 2023 Meistriliiga, also known as A. Le Coq Premium Liiga due to sponsorship reasons, is the 33rd season of the Meistriliiga, the top Estonian league for association football clubs since its establishment in 1992.

It will be the first Meistriliiga season with video assistant referee (VAR).

Teams

Stadiums and locations

Personnel and kits

Managerial changes

League table

Results

First half of season

Second half of season

Top scorers

References 

Meistriliiga seasons
1
Estonia
Estonia
Scheduled association football competitions